Acrocercops leucographa is a moth of the family Gracillariidae. It is known from Argentina.

References

leucographa
Fauna of Argentina
Gracillariidae of South America
Moths described in 1953